Simone Carmichael (née Ferrara) (born 7 June 1977) is an association football player who represented New Zealand at international level.

Career
Carmichael made her Football Ferns debut in a 1–2 loss to Canada on 31 May 2000, and represented New Zealand at the 2007 FIFA Women's World Cup finals in China, where they lost to Brazil 0–5, Denmark (0–2) and China (0–2).

Personal life
Carmichael was married on 10 April 2004. However, she wore her maiden name Ferrara on her jersey at the 2007 World Cup.

References

External links

1977 births
Living people
New Zealand women's international footballers
New Zealand women's association footballers
Women's association football midfielders
2007 FIFA Women's World Cup players